El Tour de Tucson is one of the largest road bicycling events in the United States. The El Tour de Tucson was started in 1983 by cyclist and current president of the Perimeter Bicycling Association of America, Richard DeBernardis. The ride takes place every November in Tucson, Arizona. The first El Tour attracted nearly 185 riders while in recent years between 7,000 and 10,000 cyclists have attended. 

The event offers cycling tests for all levels of riders. The route weaves around the city of Tucson, which is surrounded by five mountain ranges. The courses range from rolling to moderately hilly, with the 35 mile route being fairly flat and the perfect course for beginners.

El Tour de Tucson is a premier fundraising ride in the United States. El Tour de Tucson cyclists raise funds for Tu Nidito Children & Family Services, the American Parkinson Disease Association, Water For People, Ben's Bells Project, Big Brothers Big Sisters of America, Diamond Children's Medical Center, other Perimeter Bicycling charities, the Juvenile Diabetes Research Foundation and the Leukemia & Lymphoma Society. For the children and families at Tu Nidito, El Tour is much more than a ride. “El Tour is our livelihood,” said Executive Director Liz McCusker. More than 8,000 cyclists participated in the 2008 El Tour de Tucson, raising more than $200,000 for Tu Nidito Children and Family Services.

References

External links
 
 26th El Tour de Tucson video clips, Nov 23, 2008
 El Tour de Tucson draws second largest attendance, Kold 13 News, Nov 22, 2008
 Mexican rider wins 26th El Tour de Tucson (with video and slide show), Arizona Daily Star, Nov 22, 2008
 Tucson cyclist comfortable being a pack animal - Event newbie giving 109-miler a spin, TucsonCitizen.com, Nov 20, 2008
 El Tour de Tucson - America’s Largest Perimeter Cycling Event - Tucson, AZ, GoFurnished.com, November 22, 2008
 El Tour de Tucson:A Century Road Bike Race, YardBarker.com, Feb 12, 2008

Cycle races in the United States
Recurring sporting events established in 1983
1983 establishments in Arizona
Road bicycle races
Sports in Tucson, Arizona
Events in Tucson, Arizona